Luke Mitchell (born 17 April 1985) is an Australian actor and model. He attended the Film and Television Studio International, and won the role of Chris Knight in Neighbours in 2008. Mitchell appeared as Will in the third season of H2O: Just Add Water in 2009. He starred as Romeo Smith in Home and Away from 2009 to 2013. The role saw Mitchell win the Most Popular New Male Talent Logie Award in 2010. 

In 2013 he starred as John Young in the CW's The Tomorrow People. In 2015, he joined the cast of Marvel's Agents of S.H.I.E.L.D. for the series' second season, playing the recurring character of Inhuman Lincoln Campbell, before being promoted to series regular for its third season. He joined NBC's Blindspot as a series regular during its second season in 2016, playing Roman.

Early life
Mitchell was born on 17 April 1985 and grew up on the Gold Coast. His parents later divorced and both went on to remarry. Mitchell has three brothers, Michael, Daniel and Benjamin and a younger sister, Bree. His older brother coaches tennis, while his younger brother, Ben, was in the top 10 of Australian Tennis Players and peaked at 109 in the world rankings. Mitchell played tennis from the age of five to nineteen. He aimed to go professional, but gave it up after realizing it was the only thing in his life. Mitchell attended Nerang State High School.

Career
Mitchell trained at the Film and Television Studio International and worked with professionals such as Joss McWilliam, Iain Gardner, Kim Krejus and Dean Carey. He travelled around Australia with international entertainment company Sudden Impact Entertainment and worked in their live theatre shows.

Whilst working in Melbourne he successfully auditioned for the guest-role of Chris Knight in Neighbours and appeared in 11 episodes. He then moved back to the Gold Coast to play the part of Will in the third season of H2O: Just Add Water. In 2008, Mitchell filmed the gay-themed romance Performance Anxiety, which was selected as part of the 9th Annual Brisbane Queer Film Festival as a screening for cast and crew.

In June 2009, Mitchell relocated to Sydney and began starring as Romeo Smith in Home and Away. Mitchell won the 2010 Logie Award for Most Popular New Male Talent for his portrayal of Romeo. On 4 November 2012, it was announced that Mitchell had chosen to leave Home and Away after four years and his character departed on-screen in 2013. Following his departure from Home and Away, Mitchell was cast as John Young in The CW's remake of Tomorrow People in February 2013. In July 2014, it was announced that Mitchell had joined the cast of US series Members Only playing Jesse. However, the series was cancelled before the pilot aired.

In February 2015, Mitchell joined Agents of S.H.I.E.L.D. as Lincoln Campbell, a charismatic Inhuman; he was promoted to the main cast for season three of the show. After leaving Agents of S.H.I.E.L.D., Mitchell was cast as Roman in Blindspot. He initially turned down the audition, as he did not think he was right for the role. Upon returning to the United States, Mitchell learned that he was still wanted for the part and he sent in an audition tape. He asked if he could keep his beard and producers agreed.

In August 2018, Mitchell was cast in the lead role of Captain John "Abe" Abraham in the CBS drama The Code. He took over the role from Dave Annable, who played the character in the pilot episode. The series was cancelled after one season. Mitchell plays Rowdy in Without Remorse, a 2021 film adaptation of Tom Clancy's 1993 novel of the same name, alongside Michael B. Jordan. Mitchell played the lead role of Danny in The CW drama The Republic of Sarah which was written by Jeffrey Paul King. The series was green lit by The CW on 12 May 2020 for the 2020–2021 television season. In September 2021, The Republic of Sarah was cancelled after one season. In April 2022, he was cast in the role of Ken, the King of the Gods, in the fourth and final season for the CW drama Legacies.

Personal life
Mitchell once shared a house with his H2O: Just Add Water co-stars Burgess Abernethy, Phoebe Tonkin and Cariba Heine. During a TV Week interview, Mitchell revealed that his interests were body boarding, nature and going to the movies.

In 2009, Mitchell began dating his Home and Away co-star Rebecca Breeds. The couple announced their engagement in May 2012 and married in January 2013.

Filmography

Film

Television

Awards and nominations

References

External links

 
 

1985 births
Australian male television actors
Living people
Logie Award winners
Male actors from the Gold Coast, Queensland